Michelle Jackson is a former England women's international footballer. Her greatest achievement was playing in the winning games of the 1988 WFA Cup Final and 1994 FA Women's Cup Final with Doncaster Belles.

Honours
Doncaster Belles
 FA Women's Cup: 1990, 1992, 1994
 Runners up 1991, 1993, 2000

Leasowe
 Runners up FA Women's Cup: 1988

Bibliography

References

Living people
English women's footballers
Doncaster Rovers Belles L.F.C. players
Everton F.C. (women) players
FA Women's National League players
England women's international footballers
Women's association football defenders
Year of birth missing (living people)